Junius / Juarez is a 10-inch vinyl split EP by American art rock band Junius and American post metal band Juarez. The release was limited, with only 500 copies pressed for distribution. The record was released by UsTwo Records, an independent record label that specializes in releasing vinyl only split releases.

Track listing

Personnel
Junius
Joseph E. Martinez - vocals, lyrics, guitar, synths
Michael Repasch-Nieves - guitar
Joel Munguia - bass
Dana Filloon - drums

Juarez
Dana Fehr - guitar, vocals
Mike Sanger - drums
Johnnie Munger - bass, vocals
Tom Beach - guitar

Artwork
Andrew Weiss - photography
Helder Pedro Moreira - design
Michael Repasch-Nieves - art direction and layout

References

2010 EPs
Split EPs
Junius (band) albums
Post-metal albums